Morris Jacob Fish,  (born November 16, 1938) was a judge of the Supreme Court of Canada from 2003 to 2013.

Born in Montreal, Quebec, the son of Aaron S. Fish and Zlata Grober, he received a Bachelor of Arts (with distinction) in 1959 and a Bachelor of Law (first class honours) in 1962 from McGill University (where he was selected as the Articles Editor for the McGill Law Journal). Upon graduation from law school, he was awarded the Greenshields Prize, the Crankshaw Prize for Highest Standing in Criminal Law and the Macdonald Travelling Scholarship.

He practiced law mostly in Quebec for the law firm Cohen, Leithman, Kaufman, Yarosky & Fish which later became Yarosky, Fish, Zigman, Isaacs & Daviault between 1967 and 1989. He also lectured at a number of Canadian law schools. His expertise in practice and teaching was criminal law. He was appointed to the Quebec Court of Appeal on June 30, 1989 and was elevated to the Supreme Court of Canada on August 5, 2003, replacing Charles Gonthier. He retired from the Court on August 31, 2013.

Awards
 Appointed Queen's Counsel, 1984
 Honorary degrees from:
Yeshiva University, 2009
McGill University, 2001
 G. Arthur Martin medal for outstanding contribution to criminal justice, 2011
 Invested as a companion of the Order of Canada, 2016

See also
 Baron Byng High School
 Reasons of the Supreme Court of Canada by Justice Fish

References

External links
Supreme Court of Canada biography

1938 births
Living people
Justices of the Supreme Court of Canada
Lawyers from Montreal
Anglophone Quebec people
McGill University Faculty of Law alumni
Companions of the Order of Canada
Canadian King's Counsel
Jews from Quebec